Questioning is a major form of human thought and interpersonal communication. It involves employing a series of questions to explore an issue, an idea or something intriguing. Questioning is the process of forming and wielding that serves to develop answers and insight.
 
Questioning may also refer to:

Interrogation, interviewing as commonly employed by law enforcement officers, military personnel, and intelligence agencies with the goal of eliciting useful information
Scepticism, a state of uncertainty or doubt, or of challenging a previously held belief
Questioning (sexuality and gender), a phase or period where an individual re-assesses their sexual orientation/identity and/or gender identity
Socratic questioning (or Socratic maieutics), disciplined questioning that can be used to pursue thought in many directions and for many purposes

See also
Inquest, a judicial inquiry in common law jurisdictions, particularly one held to determine the cause of a person's death
Query (disambiguation)